Waldo Rubén Barrionuevo Ramírez (9 September 1967 – 7 July 2022) was a Bolivian Roman Catholic bishop.

Barrionuevo Ramirez was born in Bolivia and was ordained to the priesthood in 1997. He served as auxiliary bishop and Vicar Apostolic of the Apostolic Vicariate of Reyes from 2014 until his death in 2022.

References

1967 births
2022 deaths
Roman Catholic bishops of Reyes
21st-century Roman Catholic bishops in Bolivia
Bishops appointed by Pope Francis
Redemptorist bishops